Ivan Pope (born 1961) is a British technologist, involved in a number of early internet developments in the UK and across the world, including coining the term cybercafe at London's Institute of Contemporary Arts. He was a founder of two of the first internet magazines, The World Wide Web Newsletter, and later .net magazine in the UK. In 1994 he founded Webmedia to professionalise the process of web site design and build. In 1995 he was involved with the creation of the  domain name management company NetNames. Pope is now a writer and a noted proponent of the dérive.

Biography 

Pope was born in 1961, the son of Patricia Pirard, a French national, and Marius Pope, a south-African born journalist of Lithuanian Jewish descent. His younger brother is the photographer Pat Pope.

Work

3W and internet magazines 

After graduating from Goldsmiths College with a BA degree in Fine Art in 1990, Pope worked as an artist with Loophole Cinema for five years. The World Wide Web Newsletter (later 3W magazine) was created by Pope at Goldsmiths College Computer Centre early in 1993. The magazine was conceived as a general information source to promote internet use. The name was taken from the World Wide Web project of Tim Berners-Lee and the first issue was published in late 1993, reporting at the time: "there are under 100 web servers in the world".

3W opened up many opportunities and Pope left Goldsmiths College to concentrate on web development work. Pope attended the first London Internet World exhibition in 1994 as an exhibitor with 3W magazine. He was hired by Time Out magazine in London to consult on their early web development.

During 1994 Pope was asked by Future Publishing to join the team working on the first consumer internet magazine, .net. He worked from the Bath offices of Future Publishing on the first issues as Assistant Editor and also wrote extensively for the magazine during the first year of its existence.

Cybercafe 
Pope was asked to curate an internet component for an arts symposium held at the Institute of Contemporary Arts in London in March 1994. Inspired by reports of a cafe with bulletin board access in the US, he coined the term cybercafe for a weekend in the ICA theatre as part of an event called "Towards the Aesthetics of the Future", Placing internet access Apple Macs on the cafe style tables, Pope created an internet cafe concept.

Pope and internet artist Heath Bunting planned to open London's first cybercafe in 1994, although were beaten to it by Cyberia. 

With Steve Bowbrick, Pope founded Webmedia, an early web development company whose first offices were in the basement of Cyberia. The aim of Webmedia was to professionalise the design and build of web sites, a process that did not exist at that time. Webmedia grew fast over the next two years, gaining early web accounts from the likes of Lloyds Bank and Lufthansa.

Netnames and Nominet 
While managing this fast growing company and working with the nascent web industry, Pope stumbled across domain name registration and founded NetNames in 1995 to handle global name registrations for companies and individuals. In 1996 Pope objected to the uncontrolled way in which Nominet began registering UK domain names for an annual fee.  
At the time there were no specialist domain name companies and NetNames quickly gained a reputation for specialist knowledge in what became an explosive space.

In 1997 Pope separated NetNames from Webmedia, and in 2000 Pope sold NetNames to Netbenefit NBT, then a LSE listed UK company. He joined the board of Netbenefit and was briefly chair, before leaving in 2001.

By the end of the nineties Pope had been instrumental in the formation of a UK namespace organisation, Nominet UK, a non-profit that still manages the .uk namespace.

Start-ups 
In 2006 Pope founded a widget management company, Snipperoo.  He was a blogger and authority on the subject of web widgets. He has spoken at WidgetsLive! and Widgetcon. On 6 December 2007 he created Europe's first conference in digital Brighton dedicated to web widgets, Widgetygoodness.

He was the founder of Fabrivan, Thingmakers and Shapie Me.

Bibliography
 Internet UK. Prentice Hall, 1995. 
 The First Days of the Internet. Self-published. 2021.

See also
 Computer Underground Digest
 Internet in the United Kingdom

References

External links
 Archived Blog at Wayback Machine

Date of birth missing (living people)
Living people
Internet pioneers
British technology company founders
British technology writers
British people of Lithuanian-Jewish descent
1961 births